Son of a Preacher Man is a concert video by the darkwave band Collide, released in 1998 by Re-Constriction Records. It was nominated for best video in the Los Angeles Music Awards on November 18, 1999.

Track listing

Personnel
Adapted from the Son of a Preacher Man liner notes.

Collide
 Eric Anest (as Statik) – performer, programming, noises, 
 Karin Johnston (as kaRIN) – performer, vocals

Production and design
 Kevin McVey – director
 Rachelle Murway – production

Release history

References 

1998 video albums
1998 live albums
Live video albums
Collide (band) albums